Tuyoq or Tuyugou or Tuyuk is an ancient oasis-village in the Taklamakan desert, 70 km  east of Turpan in Shanshan County in a lush valley cutting into the Flaming Mountains, with a well preserved Uyghur orientation, and few tourists. It is famous for its seedless grapes and a number of ancient Buddhist meditation caves nearby containing frescos.

Coordinates: 42.858519, 89.691976

Footnotes

References
 Bonavia, Judy (2004). The Silk Road: Xi'an to Kashgar. Revised by Christoph Baumer. Odyssey Guides. Hong Kong. .

Oases of China
Turpan
Villages in China